The Junior Order of United American Mechanics is an American fraternal order. It began as a youth affiliation of the Order of United American Mechanics, but seceded to become its own organization and eventually absorbed its parent order. Originally, it was an anti-Catholic, nativist group.

In 1923 the JOUAM had 253,399 members in its "Funeral Benefit Dept" and 22,519 "Beneficiary Degree" members. Its headquarters at that time were located at 741 Wabash Building, and reportedly had state and local councils in nearly every state in the Union. It also ran a home for the orphans of deceased members in Tiffin, Ohio, which housed 800-900 children. While the Order's purposes were mostly fraternal by this point, membership remained restricted to Protestants, and some of its officers still continued to advocate anti-Catholic positions.

By 1969, membership had dwindled to 35,172, 15,000 of which were social (non-insured) members. By 1979 the number had dropped to 8,500, evenly divided between social and beneficiary members in 400 local councils. The group was then headquartered in Willow Grove, a suburb of Philadelphia, Pennsylvania and held a national convention biennially. It also had a bimonthly news paper, Junior American, which is still published.

Between 1925 and 1932, they constructed the Junior Order United American Mechanics National Orphans Home near Lexington, North Carolina. It was added to the National Register of Historic Places in 1984.

See also 
Daughters of America, the JOUAM female auxiliary

References

External links 
 

Anti-Catholicism in the United States
Anti-Catholic organizations
Anti-immigration politics in the United States
Fraternal orders